Rakhee Morzaria is a Canadian actress, most noted for her starring role as Camille Pham in the television sitcom Run the Burbs, for which she has also been a writer.

Career 
Morzaria was the creator and star of the web series Rakhee Morzaria's Note to Self, which was a Canadian Screen Award nominee for Best Original Digital Program or Series, Fiction at the 6th Canadian Screen Awards in 2018. She also received two Canadian Comedy Award nominations, for Best Performance in a Web Series and Best Writing in a Web Series, for Note to Self at the 19th Canadian Comedy Awards in 2019.

She has also had supporting or guest roles in film and television, and has acted on stage in improv comedy shows including Only Human and Past Dark.

Filmography

Film

Television

References

External links
Official website

Living people
21st-century Canadian actresses
Canadian television actresses
Canadian film actresses
Canadian stage actresses
Canadian web series actresses
Canadian actresses of Indian descent
Year of birth missing (living people)